Danilo Belić (Serbian Cyrillic: Данило Белић; born November 10, 1980) is a former Serbian football player.

Career
In February 2012, Belić went on trial with Uzbek League side FC Bunyodkor.
Belić joined FC Zhetysu on loan for the remainder of the 2012 season in June 2012.
In March 2014, Belić signed a one-year contract with FC Akzhayik of the Kazakhstan First Division, leaving the club in June of the same year.

References

External links
weltfootball.de Profile 
hlsz.hu Profile 
soccerterminal.com Profile

1980 births
Living people
Serbian footballers
Serbian expatriate footballers
Liga Portugal 2 players
Kazakhstan Premier League players
Liga I players
FK Hajduk Kula players
FK Budućnost Banatski Dvor players
FC Sopron players
Expatriate footballers in Hungary
CS Otopeni players
FC Zhetysu players
FC Taraz players
FC Ordabasy players
FC Akzhayik players
Expatriate footballers in Romania
C.F. União players
Expatriate footballers in Portugal
Expatriate footballers in Kazakhstan
Association football forwards
Serbian expatriate sportspeople in Kazakhstan
People from Vršac